"Be Your Wings/Friendship/Wait for You" is the sixth single by the band Girl Next Door and it was released on August 5, 2009. Be Your Wings was used as the theme song of PlayStation Portable game Tales of VS., Friendship was used as a Coca-Cola commercial song, and Wait for You was used as the theme song of NHK's broadcast of J-League.

CD Track listing 
 Be Your Wings
 Friendship
 Wait for You
 Jōnetsu no Daishō (Ferry Corsten Remix)
 Be Your Wings (Instrumental)

DVD Track listing 
 Be Your Wings (Music Video)
 Tales of VS. Opening Animation Movie

Charts

Oricon Sales Chart

Billboard Japan

External links
 Official website 

2009 singles
Girl Next Door (band) songs
Avex Trax singles